Stepnoy is a rural locality (a settlement) in Sorochelogovskoy Selsoviet, Pervomaysky District, Altai Krai, Russia. The population was 1 as of 2013. There is 1 street.

Geography 
Stepnoy is located 34 km northeast of Novoaltaysk (the district's administrative centre) by road. Logovskoye is the nearest rural locality.

References 

Rural localities in Pervomaysky District, Altai Krai